This is a list of seasons completed by the Drake Bulldogs men's basketball team of the National Collegiate Athletic Association (NCAA) Division I.
The Drake fielded their first team in 1906–07 with C. A. Pell coaching and are currently coached by Darian DeVries.

Seasons

References

Drake

Drake Bulldogs basketball seasons